Georgi Tsetskov Yomov (born 6 July 1997) is a Bulgarian professional footballer who plays as a winger for CSKA Sofia and the Bulgaria national team. He is a grandson of former Levski Sofia footballer Todor Barzov.

Playing youth football for Levski Sofia, Yomov began his professional career at Slavia Sofia, then transferred to CSKA Sofia in the summer of 2020 for a reported fee of €300,000. He made his senior Bulgaria debut in October 2020, having previously represented the nation at various youth levels.

Career

Early career
Yomov joined Levski Sofia at the age of 9 in 2006 and progressed through the club's academy system. In the summer of 2015 he left the club to sign a professional contract with Slavia Sofia.

Slavia Sofia
Yomov spent a few months in Slavia's youth academy and was promoted to the senior team in early 2016. He made his first team debut in a 0–0 home draw against Cherno More Varna on 21 February 2016, coming on as a substitute for Yanis Karabelyov. Two months later, on 2 April, Yomov scored his first goal for Slavia against Montana after an impressive individual effort.

For five years with Slavia Yomov made 126 appearances overall, scored 17 goals and won the Bulgarian Cup in 2018.

CSKA Sofia
On 17 August 2020, Yomov completed a move to CSKA Sofia for a reported fee of €300,000. He made his debut five days later as a 57th-minute substitute for Graham Carey in a 2–1 away win over Botev Vratsa. Yomov scored his first goal for CSKA on 24 September against B36 Tórshavn in the third qualifying round of the Europa League.

In August 2022, Yomov was suspended from playing until 25 November by UEFA after testing positive for a banned substance. On 15 March 2023 it was announced that he will receive a 4 year ban, ending on 25 August 2026.

International career
Yomov was called up to the senior Bulgaria squad for the first time in October 2020 for a UEFA Euro 2020 qualifying play-off against Hungary and a UEFA Nations League matches against Finland and Wales. He made his international debut on 8 October at Vasil Levski National Stadium, replacing Galin Ivanov in the first half against Hungary, and scored in the 89th minute of a 3–1 loss.

Career statistics

Club

International

Scores and results list Bulgaria's goal tally first.

Awards
Slavia Sofia
 Bulgarian Cup (1): 2017–18

CSKA Sofia
 Bulgarian Cup (1): 2020–21

References

External links
 

Living people
1997 births
Bulgarian footballers
Bulgaria youth international footballers
Bulgaria under-21 international footballers
Bulgaria international footballers
PFC Slavia Sofia players
PFC CSKA Sofia players
First Professional Football League (Bulgaria) players
Association football midfielders